Potted meat is a form of traditional food preservation in which hot cooked meat is placed in a pot, tightly packed to exclude air, and then covered with hot fat. As the fat cools, it hardens and forms an airtight seal, preventing some spoilage by airborne bacteria. 
Before the days of refrigeration, potted meat was developed as a way to preserve meat when a freshly-slaughtered animal could not be fully eaten immediately.

Spores of Clostridium botulinum can survive cooking at 100 °C (212 °F), and, in the anaerobic neutral pH storage environment, result in botulism. 

Often when making potted meat, the meat of only one animal was used, although other recipes, such as the Flemish potjevleesch, used three or four different meats (animals).

See also

 Bully beef
Confit
Home canning
Pâté
Potted shrimps

References

External links
A description of historical meat potting in Alberta